National Route 392 is a national highway of Japan connecting Kushiro, Hokkaidō and Honbetsu, Hokkaidō in Japan, with a total length of 83.6 km (51.95 mi).

References

National highways in Japan
Roads in Hokkaido